America’s Infrastructure Alliance (AIA) is national 501(c)(4) representing transportation companies in the United States. Its stated mission is lobbying for increased federal investment in the national transportation system. The group is made up of representatives from transportation and construction industry companies and trade groups, Airlines for America, American Trucking Association, Association of American Railroads and Associated General Contractors.

Unlike traditional lobbying firms, which meet directly with lawmakers and policymakers in attempts to influence decision-making, the organization is focused directly on educating voters.

Background
The American Society of Civil Engineers (ASCE) issues a report every four years called "The Report Card on America’s Infrastructure." The latest report published in March 2013 gave an improved score for the country as a whole for the first time in the 15 years: an improvement from a D to a D+. Presently, the federal government funds 25% of infrastructure activity; the remainder is paid by state and local governments.

Advocacy
The organization's goals are focused on fixing the specific problem of deteriorating roads, bridges, and other transportation media in the United States.  AIA's position is that the United States government should increase investment and rebuilding as a matter of constitutional obligation. AIA advocates against changing transportation spending from a federal government program to a state government program. T

AIA advocates for increasing the gas tax in order to increase the federal budget for repairing and maintaining bridges, railroads and roads.

The AIA also advocated for passage of the Water Resources Reform and Development Act (WRRDA), which is a bill that gives authority for maintaining and developing port and waterway infrastructure to the U.S. Army Corps of Engineers.

History and organization 
2012
 The organization is legally a non-profit corporation that was incorporated in the District of Columbia on December 11, 2012.

2013
 On March 19, 2013, AIA first announced itself as a new organization. AIA is registered as a 501c(4) tax-exempt issue education organization.

Governance
 AIA is governed by a board of directors comprising 6 individual members  and  an advisory board of companies from the airline, railroad, trucking and shipping industries.:

Executive leadership
 Chairman and president: Jeff Loveng, former Chief of Staff to Rep. Bill Shuster (R-PA
 Chief executive officer: Nicholas E. Calio

See also
 List of industry trade groups in the United States
 Transportation infrastructure

Notes

References

External links
Official website

501(c)(4) nonprofit organizations
Lobbying organizations in the United States
Organizations established in 2013
Trade associations based in the United States